The discography of Japanese American singer Monday Michiru includes several studio albums, EPs,  compilations and remix projects, and numerous singles released since her debut solo recording in 1991.

Studio albums

EPs

Remix and compilation albums

Promos

References

Discographies of Japanese artists
Jazz discographies